Ballinard may refer to:
Ballinard (civil parish), a civil parish in County Limerick, Ireland
Ballinard, Desertserges, a townland in County Cork, Ireland
Ballinard, Tullagh, a townland in County Cork, Ireland